Denver and Rio Grande is a 1952 American Technicolor Western film, directed by Byron Haskin and released by Paramount Pictures. The film is a dramatization of the building of the Denver and Rio Grande Railroad, which was chartered in 1870. It was filmed in the summer of 1951 on location on actual D&RG track (now the Durango and Silverton Narrow Gauge Railroad) near Durango, Colorado.

The film's storyline is a fictional account based on two factual right-of-way struggles in 1878-1879 between the D&RG and the Atchison, Topeka and Santa Fe Railway (here the Cañon City & San Juan RR ): across the Raton Pass from Trinidad, Colorado to Raton, New Mexico, where an armed confrontation actually took place, and the "Royal Gorge War" over a route between Cañon City and Leadville, Colorado."

Filming began shortly after the release of Santa Fe, starring Randolph Scott. which interpreted the railroad war from the point of view of the AT&SF. Santa Fe, however, had been filmed in Prescott, Arizona, without access to the actual locations, and portrayed the D&RG as an honorable competitor. Both films followed an entirely fictional depiction in the 1950 western A Ticket to Tomahawk, which was shot on the same Silverton Line trackage as Denver and Rio Grande.

Denver and Rio Grande features a spectacular head-on collision between two Denver and Rio Grande Western locomotives #319 and #345 (painted as the #268) that were slated for retirement and scrapping, filmed July 17, 1951.

Plot
In the late 1870s, chief engineer Gil Harkness and construction foreman Jim Vesser are surveying a new route for the Denver and Rio Grande Railroad (D&RG) through the Royal Gorge in Colorado. Vesser learns that a crew from the competing Cañon City & San Juan Railroad is also in the gorge and confronts former friend Bob Nelson and his unscrupulous boss, McCabe. McCabe shoots Nelson in the back during a fight but he and crony Johnny Buff blame Vesser, who thinks he accidentally shot Nelson while stunned from a blow. Linda Prescott, the secretary of D&RG president General William J. Palmer, believes Vesser to be a cowardly killer. An injunction stops work by the D&RG in the gorge and Vesser suggests they run the CC&SJ men "out on a pole." Linda, who is actually Nelson's sister and is spying for McCabe after being told by him that Vesser murdered her brother, angrily accuses him of acting above the law.

Vesser talks Harkness into defying the injunction. When he enters the camp saloon to bring the men back to work, one of McCabe's agitators sparks a brawl over not being paid. Palmer obtains payroll money in Denver, but the train returning him to the construction camp is robbed by three men, who shoot Palmer's accountant. Vesser returns to the saloon, sees two men gambling with a lot of cash when everyone else is broke  and accuses them of robbing the payroll. They try to flee towards the CC&SJ camp and a gunfight ensues. Vesser kills one and wounds the other, who Palmer identifies as one of the robbers but says that the unknown third robber is the man who murdered his accountant. Vesser confronts Linda, revealing that he saw her riding in the direction of McCabe's camp, but she dismisses his insinuations.

The injunction is lifted but Palmer announces he must go to Denver to keep the company out of receivership (and takeover by the CC&SJ). Linda reveals his plans to McCabe, who assembles his drunken thugs to prevent Palmer from getting to Denver by stealing a D&RG  train and seizing all its stations to block the tracks. A D&RG telegrapher warns Palmer, who rallies his men to fight McCabe's. Vesser, Palmer and the D&RG men barrel through the blockade. Vesser and Harkness uncouple the engine from the rest of their train and allow it to crash head on into the stolen train to stop it from killing all of the others. Linda has doubts about McCabe after the violence and admits everything, but Palmer lets her go free.

Vesser barricades the gorge to keep McCabe in his camp while Palmer continues on to Denver via another branch. Linda returns to the camp and recognizes Buff as the killer of the accountant, who admits it just as McCabe enters. They argue and Buff exposes McCabe as Bob Nelson's killer. McCabe puts dynamite on a train car that will be sent hurtling into Vesser's barricade. Dodging bullets from McCabe and Buff, Linda runs to the barricade to warn Vesser and the others, who scatter in time to avoid the blast. McCabe, however, is shot in the back by Buff and killed in the explosion. Vesser forgives Linda and looks forward to building the railroad.

Cast

Home media
The film was originally released on VHS on November 11, 1998. DVD and Blu-ray issues were released on May 29, 2012.

References
Notes

Citations

External links

 
 
 
 

1952 films
1952 Western (genre) films
American Western (genre) films
Films directed by Byron Haskin
Films scored by Paul Sawtell
Films set in Denver
Films set in the 1870s
Films shot in Colorado
Paramount Pictures films
Rail transport films
1950s English-language films
1950s American films